The 2014 World RX of Portugal was the opening round of the 2014 FIA World Rallycross Championship and the first ever round of the FIA World Rallycross Championship. The event was held at the Pista Automóvel de Montalegre in the Portuguese border town of Montalegre. Four of the seven stages of the round, including the final, were won by 2003 WRC champion Petter Solberg, with the young guns Bakkerud and Nitišs rounding out the podium for Olsbergs MSE.

Heats

Semi-finals

Semi-final 1

Semi-final 2

† Andy Scott was classified overall 12th, however was unable to make the semi-final grid. Jos Jansen was allowed to take his place.

Final

Championship standings after the event

References

External links

|- style="text-align:center"
|width="35%"|Previous race:None
|width="30%"|FIA World Rallycross Championship2014 season
|width="35%"|Next race:2014 World RX of Great Britain
|- style="text-align:center"
|width="35%"|Previous race:None
|width="30%"|World RX of Portugal
|width="35%"|Next race:2015 World RX of Portugal
|- style="text-align:center"

Portugal
World RX